Gusterath is a municipality in the Trier-Saarburg district, in Rhineland-Palatinate, Germany. It belongs to the Verbandsgemeinde Ruwer.

Geography 
Gusterath is located in the Ruwer valley close to Trier. To the north, the closest villages are Korlingen and Gutweiler. Due east is Lonzenburg, itself a part of Schöndorf. Pluwig is to the south and Hockweiler to the west. The closest part of Trier to Gusterath is Irsch.

History 

In the era of Ancient Rome, several small farms existed in the area of modern Gusterath.

Politics

Local mayor 

 1987–2009: Günter Scherer, SPD
 2009–2019: Alfred Bläser, FWG
 since 2019: Stefan Metzdorf, SPD

References

Municipalities in Rhineland-Palatinate
Trier-Saarburg